Roger Caillois (3 March 1913 – 21 December 1978) was a French intellectual whose idiosyncratic work brought together literary criticism, sociology, ludology and philosophy by focusing on diverse subjects such as games and play as well as the sacred. He was also instrumental in introducing Latin American authors such as Jorge Luis Borges, Pablo Neruda and Miguel Ángel Asturias to the French public. After his death, the French Literary award Prix Roger Caillois was named after him in 1991.

Biography
Caillois was born in Reims, but moved to Paris as a child. There he studied at the Lycée Louis-le-Grand, an elite school where students took courses after graduating from secondary school in order to prepare for entry examinations for France's most prestigious university, the École Normale Supérieure. Caillois's efforts paid off and he graduated as a normalien in 1933. After this he studied at the École Pratique des Hautes Études, where he came into contact with thinkers such as Georges Dumézil, Alexandre Kojève and Marcel Mauss.

The years before the war were marked by Caillois's increasingly leftist political commitment, particularly in his fight against fascism. He was also engaged in Paris's avant-garde intellectual life. With Georges Bataille he founded the College of Sociology, a group of intellectuals who lectured regularly to one another. Formed partly as a reaction to the Surrealist movement that was dominant in the 1920s, the College sought to move away from surrealism's focus on the fantasy life of an individual's unconscious and focus instead more on the power of ritual and other aspects of communal life. Caillois's background in anthropology and sociology, and particularly his interest in the sacred, exemplified this approach. He participated in Bataille's review Acéphale (1936–39).

Caillois left France in 1939 for Argentina, where he stayed until the end of World War II. During the war he was active in fighting the spread of Nazism in Latin America as an editor and author of anti-Nazi periodicals. From 1940 to 1945, he lived in South America. In 1948, after the War, he worked with UNESCO and traveled widely. In 1971 he was elected to the Académie française. In 1977, he started to write a book with the painter Bernard Mandeville. In 1978, Caillois wrote Le fleuve Alphée, an award-winning autobiographical essay (Marcel Proust Awards and European Union Prize for Literature), followed by Cases d’un échiquier. He died, aged 65, in Kremlin-Bicêtre.

Today Caillois is remembered for founding and editing Diogenes, an interdisciplinary journal funded by UNESCO, and La Croix du Sud (Southern Cross), a collection of books translated from contemporary Latin American authors published by Gallimard that is responsible for introducing authors such as Jorge Luis Borges, Alejo Carpentier and Victoria Ocampo to the French-speaking public. He is also widely cited in the nascent field of ludology, primarily from passages in his book Les Jeux et les Hommes(1958). The book has been translated to English by Meyer Barash in 1961 as Man, Play and Games.

Criticism for Euro-Centric Defense of Colonialism 
Aimé Césaire wrote extensively on Caillois' philosophy in "Discourses on Colonialism" (1955)  which can be interpreted to make three sweeping claims to European (white) supremacy: 
 Science- That the West invented science. That the West alone knows how to think; that at the borders of the Western world there begins the shadowy realm of primitive thinking, which, dominated by the notion of participation, incapable of logic, is the very model of faulty thinking.” (p 19). Also claimed that “ethnography is white” (p 20) "
 Ethics- By way of comparison, Caillois argues that the West is ethically superior to other cultures as a justification for continuing French colonial projects. Césaire "The conclusion is inescapable: compared to the cannibals, the dismemberers, and other lesser breeds, Europe and the West are the incarnation of respect for human dignity."
 Religion- Césaire concludes his commentary on Caillois commenting on his admiration for the achievements of Catholicism over other religious traditions: "Here, M. Caillois is careful not to let himself be deceived by the empty prestige of the Orient. Asia, mother of gods, perhaps. Anyway, Europe, mistress of rites. And see how wonderful it is: on the one hand — outside of Europe — ceremonies of the voodoo type, with all their “ludicrous masquerade, their collective frenzy, their wild alcoholism, their crude exploitation of a naïve fervor,” and on the other hand — in Europe — those authentic values which Chateaubriand was already celebrating in his Genie du christianisme: “The dogmas and mysteries of the Catholic religion, its liturgy, the symbolism of its sculptors and the glory of the plainsong.”

Caillois' key ideas on play

Caillois built critically on an earlier theory of play developed by the Dutch cultural historian Johan Huizinga in his book Homo Ludens (1938). Huizinga had discussed the importance of play as an element of culture and society.  He used the term  "Play Theory" to define the conceptual space in which play occurs, and argued that play is a necessary (though not sufficient) condition for the generation of culture.

Caillois began his own book Man, Play and Games (1961) with Huizinga's definition of play:

Summing up the formal characteristics of play we might call it a free activity standing quite consciously outside "ordinary" life as being "not serious," but at the same time absorbing the player intensely and utterly. It is an activity connected with no material interest, and no profit can be gained by it. It proceeds within its own proper boundaries of time and space according to fixed rules and in an orderly manner. It promotes the formation of social groupings which tend to surround themselves with secrecy and to stress their difference from the common world by disguise or other means.

Caillois disputed Huizinga's emphasis on competition in play. He also noted the considerable difficulty in arriving at a comprehensive definition of play, concluding that play is best described by six core characteristics: 
 1. it is free, or not obligatory
 2. it is separate from the routine of life, occupying its own time and space
 3. it is uncertain, so that the results of play cannot be pre-determined and the player's initiative is involved
 4. it is unproductive in that it creates no wealth, and ends as it begins economically speaking
 5. it is governed by rules that suspend ordinary laws and behaviours and that must be followed by players
 6. it involves imagined realities that may be set against 'real life'.

Caillois' definition has itself been criticized by subsequent thinkers; and ultimately, despite Caillois' attempt at a definitive treatment, definitions of play remain open to negotiation.

Caillois distinguished four categories of games:

 Agon, or competition. It's the form of play in which a specific set of skills is put to the test among players (strength, intelligence, memory). The winner is who proves to have mastery of said skill through the game, for example a quiz game is a competition of intelligence, the winner proves that it's more intelligent than the other players. E.g. chess.
 Alea, or chance, the opposite of Agon, Caillois describes Alea as "the resignation of will, an abandonment to destiny." If Agon used the skills of players to determine a victor Alea leaves that to luck, an external agent decides who the victor is. E.g. playing a slot machine.
 Mimicry, or mimesis, or role playing Caillois defines it as "When the individual plays to believe, to make himself or others believe that he is different from himself." E.g. playing an online role-playing game.
 Ilinx (Greek for "whirlpool"), or vertigo, in the sense of altering perception by experiencing a strong emotion (panic, fear, ecstasy) the stronger the emotion is, the stronger the sense of excitement and fun becomes. E.g. taking hallucinogens, riding roller coasters, children spinning until they fall down.

It's worth noting that these categories can be combined to create a more diverse experience and enhance the players interaction, for example poker is a form of Agon-Alea, Alea is present in the form of the cards and  their combinations, but it's not the only winning factor; since Agon is present in the form of bluffing, making your opponent think you have better cards by rising the bet, therefore putting pressure on the other players and thus making it possible to win by having a card combination but winning by implementing the bluff skill.

Caillois also described a dualistic polarity within which the four categories of games can be variously located:

 Paidia or uncontrolled fantasy, spontaneous play through improvisation, the rules of which are created during playing time. E.g. concerts and festivals.
 Ludus which requires effort, patience, skill, or ingenuity, the rules are set from the beginning and the game was designed before playing time. E.g. the Chinese game of Go.

Caillois disagreed particularly with Huizinga's treatment of gambling. Huizinga had argued in Homo Ludens that the risk of death or of losing money corrupts the freedom of "pure play". Thus to Huizinga, card-games are not play but "deadly earnest business". Moreover, Huizinga considered gambling to be a "futile activity" which inflicts damage on society. Thus Huizinga argued that gambling is a corruption of a more original form of play.

Against this, Caillois argued that gambling is a true game, a mode of play that falls somewhere between games of skill or competition and games of chance (i.e. between the Agon and Alea categories). Whether or not a game involves money or a risk of death, it can be considered a form of Agon or Alea as long as it provides social activity and triumph for the winner. Gambling is "like a combat in which equality of chances is artificially created, in order that adversaries should confront each other under ideal conditions, susceptible of giving precise and incontestable value to the winner’s triumph."

Caillois' interest in mimicry
When Caillois worked with Bataille at the College of Sociology, they worked on two essays on insects in the 1930s: ‘La mante religieuse. De la biologie à la psychanalyse’ (1934) and ‘Mimétisme et la psychasthénie légendaire’ (1935) Caillois identifies "the praying mantis and mimicking animals as nature’s automatons and masquerades." He formulates "in his peculiarly naturalist fashion what it would mean to act and create without the intervention of the sovereign ego, that magnificent artifact of the modern West that surrealism and the avant-garde have taken such drastic measures to counteract." These articles "might read like two obscurantist entomological studies that, in a way some would describe as bizarre, try to contradict all evolutionary explications for animal cannibalism and mimicry. Their publication in the context of [the surrealist journal] Minotaure makes it possible to see them as the search for figures that evidence the possibility of intelligence without thought, creativity without art, and agency in the absence of the (human) agent."

Roger Caillois French Literary Prize
The Roger Caillois French Literary Prize for Latin American Literature was created in 1991 and has also been awarded to figures such as Carlos Fuentes, José Donoso and Adolfo Bioy Casares.

Bibliography 
The Saragossa Manuscript by Jan Potocki, ed. and preface by Roger Caillois, trans. Elisabeth Abbott. New York, Orion Press, 1960.

Man and the Sacred, trans. Meyer Barash. New York, Free Press of Glencoe, 1960.

Man, Play and Games, trans. Meyer Barash. New York, Free Press of Glencoe, 1961.

The Dream Adventure, ed. Roger Caillois. New York, Orion Press, 1963.

The Mask of Medusa. New York, C.N. Potter, 1964.

The Dream and Human Societies, ed. Roger Caillois and G. E. Von Grunebaum. Berkeley, University of California Press, 1966.

L'ecriture des pierres. Geneve, Editions d'Art Albert Skira, 1970.

Le champ des signes: récurrences dérobées: aperçu sur l'unité et la continuité du monde physique intellectuel et imaginaire ou premiers éléments d'une poétique généralisée, with 25 illustrations by Estève. Paris, Hermann, 1978.

The Mystery Novel, trans. Roberto Yahni and A.W. Sadler. New York, Laughing Buddha Press, 1984.

The Writing of Stones, with an introduction by Marguerite Yourcenar. Charlottesville, University of Virginia Press, 1985.

The Edge of Surrealism: A Roger Caillois Reader, ed. Claudine Frank, trans. Claudine Frank and Camille Naish. Durham, Duke University Press, 2003.

Pontius Pilate: A Novel, trans. Charles Lam Markmann, with an introduction by Ivan Strenski. Charlottesville, University of Virginia Press, 2006.

Notes

References
 

1913 births
1978 deaths
Writers from Reims
École Normale Supérieure alumni
École pratique des hautes études alumni
Commanders of the Ordre national du Mérite
Lycée Louis-le-Grand alumni
Members of the Académie Française
Officiers of the Légion d'honneur
Burials at Montparnasse Cemetery
French surrealist writers
Spanish–French translators
Translators of Jorge Luis Borges
20th-century French translators
French male writers
Game studies